The Perquilauquén River (mapudungun: for "purgative") is a tributary of the Loncomilla river, in the Maule Region of Chile. The river joins the Longaví to form the Loncomilla, a tributary of the Maule river.

Geography
The Perquilauquén flows initially from southeast to northwest and forms the border between the provinces of Linares, Itata and Punilla. Subsequently, it changes its course flowing north, then east and then north, again, until it is joined by the Longaví.

External links
Google maps aerial view. Perquilauquén River and bridge, Chile
 Google maps aerial view. Changing courses of the river Perquilauquén
Google maps aerial view of the southern ⅔ of Linares Province, Chile, showing part of the basins of Rivers Ancoa, Achibueno, Longaví and Perquilauquén

Rivers of Maule Region
Rivers of Ñuble Region
Rivers of Chile